Forst is a district of the municipality Bevern, Lower Saxony, Germany.

Forst lies in the Weser Uplands.

In the 1970s, the krautrock musicians Hans-Joachim Roedelius, Dieter Moebius and Michael Rother lived there.

References

Geography of Lower Saxony